Karlos may refer to 

Karlos (name)
Juan Karlos, Filipino rock band

See also

Carlos (disambiguation)
Karlo (disambiguation)
Karlov (disambiguation)